Jean-Pierre Kalfon (born 30 October 1938) is a French actor and singer.

Selected filmography

External links
 

1938 births
Living people
French male film actors
French male television actors
Male actors from Paris
French male stage actors
20th-century French male actors
21st-century French male actors